Old Town Savings Bank, also known as Cala Brothers, is a historic loft building located at Baltimore, Maryland, United States. It is a three-story loft structure designed by architect Frank E. Davis (1839-1921) and constructed in 1871. Both the street façades are cast iron, four bays wide on Gay Street and eight bays wide on Exeter Street.  It is a Full Cast Iron Front building.  It operated as a bank until about 1940, then housed a wholesale distributor of tobacco and confectionery.

Old Town Savings Bank was listed on the National Register of Historic Places in 1996.

References

External links
, including photo from 1989, at Maryland Historical Trust

Cast-iron architecture in Baltimore
Commercial buildings on the National Register of Historic Places in Baltimore
Italianate architecture in Maryland
Commercial buildings completed in 1871
Bank buildings on the National Register of Historic Places in Maryland
Jonestown, Baltimore